Live in Hokkaido 1995.12.4 Bootleg is an X Japan live album released on January 21, 1998. It contains a shortened recording of the band's performances at the Tsukisamu Green Dome on December 4, 1995. The "bootleg" moniker applies as the album's sound quality is not on par with X Japan's other live recordings. The album reached number 20 on the Oricon chart.

Track listing

References 

X Japan live albums
1998 live albums